Torralba de los Sisones is a municipality located in the province of Teruel, Aragon, Spain. According to the 2004 census (INE), the municipality had a population of 221 inhabitants.

References

Municipalities in the Province of Teruel